
Year 827 (DCCCXXVII) was a common year starting on Tuesday (link will display the full calendar) of the Julian calendar.

Events 
 By place 
 Byzantine Empire 
 June 14 – Euphemius, exiled Byzantine admiral, asks for the help of North African Arabs, to retake Sicily and Malta from the Byzantines. Emir Ziyadat Allah I of Ifriqiya promises to return the islands to Euphemius, in exchange for a yearly tribute, and sends an Arab Muslim expeditionary force of 10,000 men under the 70-year-old Asad ibn al-Furat, which lands at Mazara del Vallo in Sicily.
 Fall – Siege of Syracuse: Muslim forces under Asad ibn al-Furat, in support of the rebel Byzantine army, besiege Syracuse, Sicily.

 Europe 
 Summer – Omurtag, ruler (khan) of the Bulgarian Empire, launches an attack to the West, and penetrates into Pannonia. He expels the local chiefs, and installs Bulgar governors over the Slavic tribes to control them. Omurtag conquers the cities of Beograd, Braničevo, Sirmium, and most of eastern Slavonia.
 Giustiniano Participazio deposes his younger brother Giovanni I, and is appointed doge of Venice. Giovanni, who is part of a pro-Frankish faction, is exiled to Zara (modern Croatia).

 Britain 
 Æthelstan establishes himself as king of East Anglia, after killing King Ludeca of Mercia in battle. Ludeca is succeeded by Wiglaf, father-in-law (and probably distant cousin) of the late king Ceolwulf I's daughter.

 China 
 Emperor Jing Zong is assassinated by a group of conspirators. He is succeeded by his brother Wen Zong, as ruler of the Tang Dynasty.

 By topic 

 Religion 
 August 27 – Pope Eugene II dies after a 3-year reign, and is succeeded by Valentine as the 100th pope of the Catholic Church.
 October 10 – Pope Valentine dies just after a two-month reign, and is succeeded by Gregory IV as the 101st pope of Rome.

 Science 
 Chalid Ben Abdulmelik and Ali Ben Isa travel to the Plain of Sinjar (modern Iraq), under orders of Caliph Al-Ma'mun, to measure the size of the Earth.

 Agriculture 
 The Saracens, who found spinach originally in Persia (modern Iran), introduce the plant to Sicily.

Births 
 Cyril, Byzantine missionary and bishop (d. 869)
 Ibn al-Rawandi, Muslim scholar and writer (d. 911)
 Maura of Troyes, Frankish noblewoman and saint (d. 850)

Deaths 
 January 1 – Adalard of Corbie, Frankish abbot
 August 27 – Eugene II, pope of the Catholic Church
 October 10 – Valentine, pope of the Catholic Church
 Agnello Participazio, doge of Venice
 Claudius, archbishop of Turin
 Grigol of Kakheti, Georgian prince
 Guillemundus, Frankish nobleman
 Hildegrim, bishop of Châlons
 Jing Zong, emperor of the Tang Dynasty (b. 809)
 Li Yi, Chinese poet (or 829)
 Ludeca, king of Mercia
 Wu Chongyin, Chinese general (b. 761)
 Yaoshan Weiyan, Chinese Buddhist monk (b. 745)

References